Veil of Trees is an art installation within the grounds of the Royal Botanical Gardens in Sydney. The work was designed by Janet Laurence and Jisuk Han as part of the Sydney Sculpture Walk Program in 1999, to highlight the indigenous botanical history of the site. It consists of 21 glass panels among one hundred red forest gums (Eucalyptus tereticornis) which run along a one hundred metre grassed ridge between two parallel roads.

Description 

The panels are made of glass edged with Corten-steel containing LED lighting. Some panels enclose historically native seeds, ash, honey and resin, while others have verses from poetry written by Australian writers and poets. The play of light on the translucent glass create a passage of reflection, and memory.

The work aims to highlight the native natural environment and indigenous history, as well as the importance of historical preservation through botanical conservatories. The red gums refer to the forest of original gums axed as a result of early European settlement with hopes to rejuvenate the site with its native trees and grass plants.

Artist collaboration 
The collaboration was between two artists Janet Laurence and Jisuk Han. Janet Laurence is a Sydney based artist whose work examines the interconnection of life forms and ecologies. Jisuk Han has worked in interpretive design, art and architecture for more than twenty years and collaborates with artists, architects, curators and museums throughout Australia.

See also
 Edge of the Trees

References 

Public art in Sydney